Zoltán Böőr  (born 14 August 1978 in Debrecen) is a retired Hungarian footballer. He was a member of the Hungarian XI and scored his only goal against San Marino during the UEFA Euro 2004 qualifying on 11 June 2003.

Böőr previously played for Manisaspor in the Turkish Super Lig.

References

1978 births
Living people
Sportspeople from Debrecen
Hungarian footballers
Association football midfielders
Hungary international footballers
Debreceni VSC players
Manisaspor footballers
Győri ETO FC players
Nyíregyháza Spartacus FC players
Újpest FC players
Rákospalotai EAC footballers
Dunaújváros PASE players
Nemzeti Bajnokság I players
Hungarian expatriate footballers
Expatriate footballers in Turkey
Hungarian expatriate sportspeople in Turkey